Freedom of contract is the process in which individuals and groups form contracts without government restrictions.  This is opposed to government regulations such as minimum-wage laws, competition laws, economic sanctions, restrictions on price fixing, or restrictions on contracting with undocumented workers.  The freedom to contract is the underpinning of laissez-faire economics and is a cornerstone of free-market libertarianism.  The proponents of the concept believe that through "freedom of contract", individuals possess a general freedom to choose with whom to contract, whether to contract or not, and on which terms to contract.

History
Henry James Sumner Maine proposed that social structures evolve from roles derived from social status to those based on contractual freedom. A status system establishes obligations and relationships by birth, but a contract presumes that the individuals are free and equal. Modern libertarianism, such as that advanced by Robert Nozick, sees freedom of contract as the expression of the independent decisions of separate individuals pursuing their own interests under a "minimal state."

United States

Lochner v. New York

In 1902, a New York baker named Joseph Lochner was fined for violating a state law limiting the number of hours his employees could work. He sued the state on the grounds that he was denied his right to "due process." Lochner claimed that he had the right to freely contract with his employees and that the state had unfairly interfered with this. In 1905, the Supreme Court used the due process clause to declare unconstitutional the New York state statute imposing a limit on hours of work. Rufus Wheeler Peckham wrote for the majority: "Under that provision no state shall deprive any person of life, liberty, or property without due process of law. The right to purchase or to sell labor is part of the liberty protected by this amendment."

Writing in dissent, Oliver Wendell Holmes Jr. accused the majority of basing its decision on laissez-faire ideology. He believed that it was making law based on economics rather than interpreting the constitution. He believed that "Liberty of Contract" did not exist and that it was not intended in the Constitution.

Afterward
In his "Liberty of Contract" (1909), Roscoe Pound critiqued freedom-of-contract laws by laying out case after case in which labor rights were struck down by state and federal Supreme Courts. Pound argued the courts' rulings were "simply wrong" from the standpoint of common law and "even from that of a sane individualism" (482). Pound further compared the situation of labor legislation in his time to common opinion of usury and that the two were "of the same type" (484). Pound lamented that the legacy of such "academic" and "artificial" judicial rulings for liberty of contract engendered a "lost respect for the courts" but predicted a "bright" future for labor legislation (486-487).

The Supreme Court applied the liberty of contract doctrine sporadically over the next three decades but generally upheld reformist legislation as being within the states' police power. In 1937 the Court reversed its view in the case West Coast Hotel Co. v. Parrish. In that case the court upheld a Washington state law setting a minimum wage.

United Kingdom
In the late 19th century, the English judiciary espoused "freedom of contract" as a generally applicable feature of public policy, best expressed in Printing and Numerical Registering Co v Sampson by Sir George Jessel MR. In the later 20th century, the view of the common law had changed completely. In George Mitchell (Chesterhall) Ltd v Finney Lock Seeds Ltd, Lord Denning MR compared "freedom of contract" with oppression of the weak, as he outlined the development the law had undergone.

Law and economics 
In economics, the freedom of contract has been studied in the field of contract theory. According to the Coase Theorem, the freedom of contract is beneficial in the absence of transaction costs. When two rational parties voluntarily enter into a contract, they must be (at least weakly) better off than in the absence of the contract. The parties will agree on a contract that maximizes the total surplus that they can generate. Hence, restrictions on the class of enforceable contracts can only reduce the total surplus. Yet, prohibiting certain contracts can be beneficial when there are transaction costs. For example, Spier and Whinston (1995) have shown that not enforcing a contract between two parties can be desirable when the contract has negative external effects on a third party (which does not participate in the contract due to transaction costs). It has also been argued that the presence of asymmetric information can make restrictions on the freedom of contract desirable, since such restrictions can prevent inefficient distortions due to signalling and screening., Similarly, when there are transaction costs due to moral hazard problems, restrictions on the freedom of contract can be welfare-enhancing. Furthermore, it can be desirable not to enforce certain contracts when agents are susceptible to cognitive biases. Finally, an important problem is whether contractual parties should have the freedom to restrict their own freedom to modify their contract in the future. Schmitz (2005) and Davis (2006) argue that it can be beneficial not to enforce non-renegotiation clauses in contracts.,

See also 
 Free contract
 Lochner era
 Inequality of bargaining power
 English contract law
 United States contract law

References
 Atiyah, P.S: "The Rise and Fall of Freedom of Contract" (Oxford University Press, USA; New ed; Dec 12, 1985) 
 Bernstein, David E.: Freedom of Contract, George Mason Law & Economics Research Paper No. 08-51 (2008)
 Trebilcock, Michael J.: "The Limits of Freedom of Contract" (Harvard University Press)

Notes

External links
 Freedom to Contract by Dr. Edward Younkins

Classical liberalism
Contract law
Libertarian theory
Philosophy of law
Social philosophy